Khan Kasaray may refer to:
 Khan Kasaray-e Olya